Albinia is a locality in the Central Highlands Region, Queensland, Australia.

Geography 
The Mount Hope State Forest is in the western part of the locality including the mountain itself.

A number of creeks flow from west to east across the locality including Albinia Creek. These creeks are tributaries of the Comet River and ultimately contribute to the Fitzroy River which flows into the Coral Sea.

The large Rolleston coal mine is operated by Glencore Coal in the centre of the locality. The mine is supported by a number of dams and other infrastructure. A branch of the Blackwater railway system provides transport for the coal.

To the east of the mine is the Albinia National Park.

The Dawson Highway passes through from east to north.

History 
The locality and creek are believed to derive their names from the Albinia Downs, which was named by Ludwig Leichhardt on  28 December 1844 during his overland journey from Moreton Bay to Port Essington in the Northern Territory.

References 

Central Highlands Region
Localities in Queensland